Soleichthys is a genus of small soles native to coastal waters in the Indo-Pacific.

Species
There are currently eight recognized species in this genus:
 Soleichthys dori J. E. Randall & Munroe, 2008
 Soleichthys heterorhinos (Bleeker, 1856)
 Soleichthys maculosus Muchhala & Munroe, 2004 (Whiteblotched sole)
 Soleichthys microcephalus (Günther, 1862) (Small-head sole)
 Soleichthys oculofasciatus Munroe & Menke, 2004 (Banded-eye sole)
 Soleichthys serpenpellis Munroe & Menke, 2004 (Snakeskin sole)
 Soleichthys siammakuti Wongratana, 1975
 Soleichthys tubiferus (W. K. H. Peters, 1876)

References

Soleidae
Marine fish genera
Taxa named by Pieter Bleeker